Guatteria sodiroi is a species of plant in the Annonaceae family. It is endemic to Ecuador.  Its natural habitat is subtropical or tropical moist lowland forests. It is being threatened by habitat loss.

References

sodiroi
Endemic flora of Ecuador
Critically endangered flora of South America
Taxonomy articles created by Polbot